Pseudobunocephalus is a genus of banjo catfishes.

Taxonomy
The species of Pseudobunocephalus were originally classified in the genus Bunocephalus, but after further study it was found that these fish were unrelated to the type species Bunocephalus verrucosus or any of the other existing aspredinid genera. Thus, a new genus was described in 2008.

Pseudobunocephalus is the most basal genus in the family, and represents the sister group to all other Aspredinidae. P. lundbergi is also the most basal species and is the sister taxon to the rest of the species in the genus.

Species 
There are currently six species in this genus:
Pseudobunocephalus amazonicus (Mees, 1989)
Pseudobunocephalus bifidus (C. H. Eigenmann, 1942)
Pseudobunocephalus iheringii (Boulenger, 1891)
Pseudobunocephalus lundbergi Friel, 2008
Pseudobunocephalus quadriradiatus (Mees, 1989)
Pseudobunocephalus rugosus (C. H. Eigenmann & C. H. Kennedy, 1903)

Distribution
Pseudobunocephalus species are widespread in the Amazon, Orinoco, and Paraguay-Paraná River basins.

Description
Species of Pseudobunocephalus are small, all of them reaching less than 80 millimetres (3.1 in) SL. They are often mistaken at first glance with juvenile Bunocephalus species.

References

Aspredinidae
Fish of South America
Catfish genera